Gilbert Gil (September 9, 1913 – August 25, 1988) was a French film actor. He also directed a single film Criminal Brigade in 1947.

Partial filmography

 Mayerling (1936) - Un étudiant (uncredited)
 Les grands (1936) - Surot
 Forty Little Mothers (1936) - Robert Bourgeon, le fils
 Girls of Paris (1936) - Georges Levaut
 Culprit (1937) - Jérôme Forgeat
 Pépé le Moko (1937) - Pierrot
 Une femme sans importance (1937) - Gerald
 Le cantinier de la coloniale (1937)
 Gribouille (1937) - Claude Morestan
 Abused Confidence (1937) - Paul
 Le chanteur de minuit (1937) - René
 La Glu (1938) - Marie-Pierre
 The Woman Thief (1938) - Pierrot (French version)
 Cocoanut (1939) - Antoine
 Nightclub Hostess (1939) - Pierre Noblet
 Night in December (1940) - Jacques Morel
 Sarajevo (1940) - Prinzip (uncredited)
 Nous les gosses (1941) - Monsieur Morin, l'instituteur
 Histoire de rire (1941) - Achille Ballorson
 L'âge d'or (1942) - Henri Dubélair
 La Symphonie fantastique (1942) - Louis Berlioz
 La loi du printemps (1942) - Hubert Villaret
 The Murderer is Afraid at Night (1942) - Gilbert
 Monsieur La Souris (1942) - Christian Osting
 Haut le vent (1942) - Joachim
 Secrets (1943) - Michel Aylias
 Pierre and Jean (1943) - Pierre Roland
 The Last Penny (1946) - Pierre Durban
 Lessons in Conduct (1946) - Jacques
 On demande un ménage (1946) - Pierre Larrieu
 Monsieur de Falindor (1947) - Maître Basilius
 Criminal Brigade (1947) - Michel Perrin
 La dame d'onze heures (1948) - Charles Pescara
 The Murdered Model (1948) - Armand
 Born of Unknown Father (1950) - Raymond Denis
 Les mousquetaires du roi (1951)
 Royal Affairs in Versailles (1954) - Jean-Jacques Rousseau
 Napoléon (1955) - Louis Bonaparte (uncredited)
 Madelon (1955) - Un commandant d'aviation chez Maxim's
 If Paris Were Told to Us (1956) - Molière
 If All the Guys in the World (1956) - L'employé de la Gare des Invalides (uncredited)
 Ça n'arrive qu'aux vivants (1959) - Marc Mattéï
 Jugez-les bien (1961) - Litry
 Le glaive et la balance (1963) - L'inspecteur Portal
 Don't Tempt the Devil (1963) - Garat, un journaliste
 Le temps des copains (1963)
 L'assassin viendra ce soir (1964) - Paul Roubais

References

Bibliography
 Dayna Oscherwitz & MaryEllen Higgins. The A to Z of French Cinema. Scarecrow Press, 2009.

External links

1913 births
1988 deaths
French male film actors
20th-century French male actors